Freezing toilet is a kind of dry toilet powered by electricity which freezes the content in a short time. Freezing toilets work by electricity, as they are plugged into the wall. They do not need water, pipes, ventilation or chemicals to work.
The function of freezing toilets is based on freezing. The contents freeze in a short time stopping bacteria from growing and keeping it odourless. Consequently, it does not need mixtures or other chemicals.

Freezing toilets can be moved, as they only need a plug to work. The machine consumes about 40 watts of electricity.

Freezing toilets were developed in Sweden in the 1970s, but now production is in Finland.

Examples 
This kind of toilet is installed at the Mirrorcube treeroom at Treehotel (Harads, Sweden).

References

Toilet types
Sanitation
Water conservation